Hinulugang Taktak Protected Landscape, also known as Hinulugan Taktak, is a protected area located in Rizal, Philippines. Initially assigned as a recreation area, the waterfall area has been designated as a national park by virtue of Republic Act No. 6964 in 1990. Ten years later, it became a protected landscape in accordance to Proclamation No. 412. It is being managed by the Department of Environment and Natural Resources and the Rizal Provincial Government. As of 2003 and 2004, Hinulugang Taktak is the second most popular national park in the Philippines in terms of number of visitors.

History
Folk knowledge has it that the name was derived from a large bell (taktak) which was thrown (hinulog) into the falls during the 15th century or the 16th century because the local villagers considered it too loud. Since then, it has become known as Hinulugang Taktak or the place where the bell fell. Being one of Antipolo's iconic destinations, the other being the Antipolo Cathedral, Hinulugang Taktak is featured in the hymn Antipolo composed by German San Jose in 1929. The lyrics indicate that even at the time, it was already a popular recreational area.

The largest lot came from the property of James O'Hara and Concepcion Francisco, while the rest of the lots came from the properties of Concepcion Leyba y Banson and the Manila Railroad Company. Beginning in the 1960s, the waters have been slowly polluted. To stop the degradation of the falls, it was designated as a national park on 18 September 1990. The rehabilitation began as early as 1991. Seven years later, up to 75 percent of the area has been restored at a cost exceeding 45 million pesos.

On 17 November 2000, it became a protected landscape in accordance to Proclamation No. 412, effectively transferring its administration to the Department of Environment and Natural Resources and the Rizal Provincial Government. It also mandated the use of the trust fund through the Integrated Protected Area Fund System to add to the limited funding for the park from the national government. Renewed efforts were made to rehabilitate the area starting 2009 with an initial three-year budget of 100 million pesos, and in 2013. However, an oil spill in 2015 forced the closure of the park, and to further intensify rehabilitation efforts. Private institutions also helped in the restoration, including photo exhibits, bamboo planting and other re-greening efforts in the area. Eleven days after the oil spill, the park was reopened to visitors.

On February 13, 2020 the Hinulugang Takatak had reopened to the public after a long year rehabilitation and featured recreational activities are spider web platform, hanging bridges, and a wall climbing facility.

Geography and geology
The park contains the headwaters of the Sapang Baho River (also known as Antipolo River and Taktak River), which flows to Laguna de Bay through the Manggahan Floodway. Due to the accumulated water pollution, it was deemed unsafe for recreational purposes such as swimming. The falls have a height of 21.5 meters (70.5 feet) and a width of 25.8 meters (84.6 feet). The rocks beneath the Quaternary soil are Miocene layers. However, the area itself is susceptible to erosion, landslides, and earthquakes.

Biology and ecology
There are at least 11 species of trees in the area, including Senna spectabilis, Cananga odorata, Swietenia macrophylla, Pterocarpus indicus, Chrysophyllum cainito, Artocarpus heterophyllus, Persea americana, Sandoricum koetjape, Mangifera indica, Averrhoa bilimbi, and Cocos nucifera. While there is no report of endemic or endangered species present, animal species in the area include Varanus salvator, Python reticulatus, and Draco volans.

Recreation
Facilities began to be built as part of the continuing rehabilitation effort starting in 2002. Due to water pollution, the river itself was deemed unsafe for swimming. As an alternative, a nearby pool was constructed for swimmers. Private resorts and hotels have also been built near the area. Since its designation as a national park and its consequent rehabilitation, visitors have steadily increased from 45,563 in 1995 to 83,431 in 2004. This raised the profile of Hinulugang Taktak as the nation's second most popular national park, following the Ninoy Aquino Parks and Wildlife Center. As of 2008, it also recorded the third largest income for any protected area in the Philippines with 11.1 million pesos, following the Ninoy Aquino Parks and Wildlife Center (first) and the Mount Apo Natural Park (second).

Gallery

References

External links

 Culture, nature in Metro Manila’s neighbor (Philippine Daily Inquirer)
 Hinulugang Taktak (Philippine Primer)
 Hinulugang Taktak Waterfalls (Visit Pinas)

Antipolo
Geography of Rizal
IUCN Category V
Landforms of Rizal
Protected areas established in 1952
Protected landscapes of the Philippines
Tourist attractions in Rizal
Waterfalls of the Philippines